St Francis Girls' Secondary School is a Catholic secondary school for girls located in Mbeya, Tanzania. The school is owned by the Catholic Church in Mbeya Archdiocese, and is run by the Sisters of St. Charles Borromeo.

St Francis is one of the top-ranked schools in Tanzania, regularly performing well in Form Four Certificate of Secondary Education Examination (CSEE) results. Six out of the ten top Form Four students in 2019 were from St Francis. In 2020, the school dropped from first-ranked to second-ranked, though all students who sat for the exams passed. In 2021, "The Tanzania One" (the student with the highest CSEE score) came from St Francis, with 7 other St Francis students placing in the top 10.

See Also 

 Catholic Church in Tanzania
 Education in Tanzania
 List of schools in Tanzania

References

Girls' schools in Tanzania
Mbeya Region
Catholic secondary schools in Tanzania
Augustinian schools